Sea of Sand (released in the US as Desert Patrol) is a 1958 British war film starring Richard Attenborough, John Gregson and Michael Craig. The film, which was directed by Guy Green, is about a patrol of the Long Range Desert Group (LRDG) during the North African Campaign in the Second World War. It was shot on location in the Kingdom of Libya.

Plot
On the eve of the Battle of El Alamein, Captain Tim Cotton leads a patrol on a raid to destroy a German fuel dump located deep behind enemy lines. Captain Williams of the Royal Engineers is posted to Cotton's patrol to deal with a minefield surrounding a German petrol dump. As a regular soldier, Williams takes time to adjust to the non-regulation way the LRDG operates.
He finds a girl's torn up picture in Cotton's billet, who dismisses her as "old news". Later on Williams shows Cotton a picture of his son; Cotton says he has everything to live for.

The mission, which begins with five Chevrolet 30 cwt trucks, starts with a perilous journey through Axis-occupied Libya where the LRDG encounter Luftwaffe spotter planes and Africa Korps patrols. Six of their men are killed and two of their Chevrolets are destroyed by a German armoured car. On reaching the German supply depot, Williams does his job and creates a path through the minefield with the help of Corporal Mathieson. The rest of the group destroys the stocks of petrol but Sergeant Hardy is killed in the escape. However hidden within the dump is a large number of German panzers. Unfortunately Cotton cannot report this to base because the radio is smashed in a German ambush, during which 'Blanco' White is wounded in the leg.

Knowing the importance of the information, the group knows they must return and report it to base while there is time for it to be acted upon. During their return journey they are relentlessly pursued by a German officer determined to stop them. When two half-tracks attack them Cotton is wounded in the arm and Sergeant Nesbitt, the New Zealander, is killed. Eventually - with just 40 miles to go to the Allied base - the last truck runs out of fuel. Blanco volunteers to stay behind and man a Vickers machine gun, Brody offers to stay with his friend but Cotton says "Everyone who can goes on". While the others head towards base, Blanco sacrifices himself slowing up the last pursuing German halftrack.

The group, with their water exhausted, sight another LRDG patrol on a truck. But before they can signal them, the chasing Germans are spotted. Williams grabs a Sten gun and leads the Germans away from his group. His actions allow the LRDG patrol to outflank and destroy the half-track; however, he is killed. Cotton laments that he had everything to live for.

The film concludes with Cotton reporting the tanks to his CO back at base. They also speak of Williams and the sacrifice he made for the group. The opening barrage of El Alamein starts.

Cast

 Michael Craig as Captain Tim Cotton
 John Gregson as Captain Bill Williams R.E.
 Richard Attenborough as Trooper Brody
 Percy Herbert as Corporal "Blanco" White
 Barry Foster as Corporal Matheson
 Vincent Ball as Sergeant Nesbitt 
 Andrew Faulds as Sergeant Parker 
 George Murcell as Corporal Simms 
 Ray McAnally as Sergeant Hardy 
 Harold Goodwin as Road Watch
 Tony Thawnton as Captain Tom 
 Wolf Frees as German Sergeant 
 George Mikell as German Officer  
 Martin Benson as German Half-track Officer (uncredited) 
 Dermot Walsh as Commanding Officer (uncredited)

Production

Writing
The screenplay of Sea of Sand was written by noted author and screenwriter Robert Westerby. The film's technical advisor was Bill Kennedy Shaw, who served as the LRDG's intelligence officer during desert campaign in North Africa.

Soundtrack
The score was by Clifton Parker and was performed by the Sinfonia of London under the musical direction of Muir Mathieson.

Filming
The film was shot in Tripolitania near to many sites that saw real action during the war in North Africa. Michael Craig said "we drank far too much, slept far too little and misbehaved in every possible way." Filming began 12 May 1958.

Most of the European extras in the film were British Army personnel who were stationed in Libya because of the military alliance between King Idris of Libya and the West (this relationship ended following the 1969 coup d'etat by army officers led by Muammar Gaddafi). As such, most of the military props used in the film are derived from British or American equipment. For instance the Allied troops use contemporary Chevrolet 30 cwt WB trucks mounted with Vickers machine guns. But the use of Sten submachine guns was incorrect (the real LRDG used either the .303 SMLE or the Thompson submachine gun as small arms). Likewise American half-tracks, fitted with British Bren guns, were employed to portray Africa Korps Sd.Kfz. 251s.

Craig was loaned out from Rank. He says although he thought it was a good film and a good part he felt the British film industry should be making more contemporary stories. This led to The Angry Silence.

Reception
The film was nominated for BAFTA awards for Best Film and British Film and Best British Actor for Michael Craig.

Variety praised the "excellent all-round acting and taut direction by Guy Green," and concluded, "Green and cameraman Wilkie Cooper splendidly capture the remote loneliness of the vast desert, the heat, the boredom and the sense of pending danger. The screenplay is predictable, but the dialog is reasonably natural and the various characters are well drawn."

Box Office
Kinematograph Weekly listed it as being "in the money" at the British box office in 1958.

References

External links

1958 films
1958 war films
British war films
1950s English-language films
North African campaign films
Films set in Egypt
Films set in deserts
Films directed by Guy Green
Films scored by Clifton Parker
Films shot at Pinewood Studios
Films shot in Libya
1950s British films